The Word Alive is an American metalcore band from Phoenix, Arizona. The band was formed by vocalist Craig Mabbitt in 2008. After one unreleased EP, Mabbitt was replaced by current vocalist, Tyler Smith, the same year. They were signed to Fearless Records. In 2022, the band changed their label and are currently signed to Thriller Records. They have released six studio albums and two extended plays.

Albums

Studio albums

Extended plays

Singles

Music videos

References

Discographies of American artists